The Cozd, also Valea Mare or Steana is a right tributary of the river Homorod in Romania It discharges into the Homorod in the village Homorod.

Tributaries

The following rivers are tributaries to the river Cozd:

Left: Luncșoara, Obârșița, Gorgan, Fișer, Paloș
Right: Lovnic

References

Rivers of Romania
Rivers of Brașov County